Lammi Church is a medieval stone church located in Lammi, Hämeenlinna, Southern Finland. It was built during the 1510s.

External links

Medieval stone churches in Finland
Hämeenlinna
Buildings and structures in Kanta-Häme